Planning Policy Statements (PPS) were UK government statements of national policy and principles towards certain aspects of the town planning framework. In recent years they only  applied to England. However, they still exist within the Northern Irish System.

They were not legally binding, but the Planning and Compulsory Purchase Act 2004 required that they were considered by authorities preparing development plans, and may be treated as material considerations in the determination of planning applications. They had gradually been replacing the old style Planning Policy Guidance Notes (PPG).

In December 2010 the Department for Communities and Local Government announced that all PPSs would be replaced by a single document, the National Planning Policy Framework (NPPF). A consultation draft of this new document was published on 25 July 2011. The final version of this document was published on 27 March 2012. It became a material consideration in planning matters on publication.  It replaced all PPSs and all remaining PPGs, plus a number of letters to chief planning officers.

PPS covered the following matters:
Planning Policy Statement 1: Delivering Sustainable Development PPS1
Planning Policy Statement 3: Housing PPS3
Planning Policy Statement 4: Planning for Sustainable Economic GrowthPPS4
Planning Policy Statement 5: Planning for the Historic EnvironmentPPS5
Planning Policy Statement 6: Planning for Town Centres (now cancelled and replaced by PPS 4) PPS6
Planning Policy Statement 7: Sustainable Development in Rural Areas PPS7
Planning Policy Statement 9: Biodiversity and Geological Conservation PPS9
Planning Policy Statement 10: Planning for Sustainable Waste Management PPS10
Planning Policy Statement 11: Regional Spatial Strategies PPS11 The coalition government announced in 2010 that Regional Spatial Strategies were to be abolished and, despite a court finding that the Secretary of State had acted unlawfully by telling local planning authorities to take that into account prior to abolition, the Policy Statement was removed from the DCLG website before the law was changed.
Planning Policy Statement 12: Local Development Frameworks PPS12
Planning Policy Statement 22: Renewable Energy PPS22
Planning Policy Statement 23: Planning and Pollution Control PPS23
Planning Policy Statement 25: Development and Flood Risk PPS25

See also 
Town and country planning in the United Kingdom
The Merton Rule (the result of Planning Policy Statement 22)
 Planning and Compulsory Purchase Act 2004

Statements (law)
United Kingdom planning policy
Town and country planning in England